Jackie Sardou (7 April 1919 – 2 April 1998) was a French actress.

Personal life
She was born Jacqueline Labbé in Paris, and married Fernand Sardou, a singer. 

She was the mother of singer Michel Sardou; and grandmother of author Romain Sardou and actor Davy Sardou. 

She died in 1998, five days before her 79th birthday.

Theatre

Filmography

References

French film actresses
1919 births
1998 deaths
Actresses from Paris
20th-century French actresses